Radio Concord was a pirate radio station which broadcast from west London on AM 225, medium wave between 1972 and 1976.

The station sometimes broadcast from a house in Maida Vale where "Joe Strummer" lived with the 101ers. This was a politicised counterculture station, and would comment on issues like Northern Ireland and housing rights.

DJs and staff 
The following aliases appear to have been used on air:

 El Supremo (The Supreme Dialect / Dalek) aka Tommy Arnold
 King Kong
 Joe Lung, aka Mrs Scum, Doo Wop King etc.
 Matt Black
 Len "almond slices" Deevish, aka Wolfman Fred, Keith York
 Jebediah Strutt, aka John the Baptist, The Amazing Spicer, Saskatoon Kid, Ezekial Fudge
 Simon Enfield
 Philip Day aka Philip Bendall
 Kelvin Michaels
 Dan Blocker
 Louis Deco
 Don "my old fruit" Stevens
 California Sunshine
 Anne Night in Gale Force 7
 Amy Turtle
 Anne Boleyn (with her head)
 Snoopy
 Charles De Gaul
 Captain Banana
 Dismal Dave
 Dave the Deserter
 Mick Dogfood
 Red Dirt and the Power Pack

References

Pirate radio stations in the United Kingdom
Pirate radio stations
Radio stations established in 1972
Radio stations disestablished in 1976
Defunct radio stations in the United Kingdom